2-Methoxypropene is an ether with the chemical formula C4H8O.  It is a reagent used in organic synthesis to introduce a protecting group for alcohols, and the conversion diols to the acetonide group.

2-Methoxypropene can be prepared by the elimination of methanol from dimethoxypropane, or by the addition of methanol to propyne or allene.

References

Reagents for organic chemistry
Ethers
Isopropenyl compounds